Philippe van Arnhem (born 24 August 1996) is a Dutch professional footballer who plays as a midfielder for IJsselmeervogels.

Club career
Van Arnhem joined the RKC/Willem II youth set-up and signed a three-year contract with RKC Waalwijk in 2014. He became the club's youngest ever debutant at 17 in August 2014 when he came on as a sub against Roda JC.

References

External links
 

1996 births
Living people
People from Waalwijk
Association football midfielders
Dutch footballers
RKC Waalwijk players
AS Trenčín players
Botev Plovdiv players
IJsselmeervogels players
Eerste Divisie players
Tweede Divisie players
Slovak Super Liga players
First Professional Football League (Bulgaria) players
Dutch expatriate footballers
Dutch expatriate sportspeople in Slovakia
Expatriate footballers in Slovakia
Dutch expatriate sportspeople in Bulgaria
Expatriate footballers in Bulgaria
Footballers from North Brabant